The 1960 Quebec general election was held on June 22, 1960, to elect members of the Legislative Assembly of Quebec, Canada. It was one of the most significant elections in Quebec history, rivalled perhaps only by the 1976 general election. The incumbent Union Nationale, led by Antonio Barrette, was defeated by the Quebec Liberal Party, led by Jean Lesage.

The 1960 election set the stage for the Quiet Revolution, a major social transformation of all aspects of Quebec society throughout the 1960s.  Among many other changes, the influence and power of the Catholic Church fell sharply as Quebec became a secular society.

This election put an end to 16 years of continuous Union Nationale rule, much of it under Maurice Duplessis.  Duplessis had died in 1959, ending a period that was later derisively referred to as La Grande Noirceur (the Great Darkness).

Duplessis' successor, longtime minister Paul Sauvé, saw the need to modernize a government that had long been one of the most conservative provincial governments in Canada. He initiated a "hundred days of change" that began to transform Quebec society, but they were cut short when Sauvé died suddenly after only a few months in office.  He was succeeded by another longtime minister, Antonio Barrette. However, with its second new leader in less than a year and its third in less than two years, and no published platform, the Union Nationale was thus in disarray when it went into the election.

Background
On September 7, 1959, Maurice Duplessis died during a visit to the northern mining town of Schefferville. His nearly 20 years as premier (interrupted from 1939 to 1944 by Adélard Godbout) were marked by conservatism, clientelism, deference to the Catholic hierarchy, defence of provincial powers from federal interference, opposition to Keynesianism, and fierce anti-syndicalism. Contrary to some accounts of the Grande Noirceur, however, Quebec in the late 1950s was on the path to modernization, with a largely urbanized population and a significant manufacturing sector.

Three days after the death of "le Chef" (the Boss), the cabinet chose Paul Sauvé as his successor. Sauvé undertook his "100 days" of change under the slogan "désormais " (From now on), determined to modernize the machinery of government after years of stagnation under Duplessis. On January 2, 1960, while he had wind in his sails and threatened the Liberals' momentum, the new premier died suddenly in Saint-Eustache, in his riding of Deux-Montagnes. On January 7, Antonio Barrette was chosen as premier. The party thus headed into the election with its third leader in under a year.

Jean Lesage had been elected leader of the Liberal Party on May 31, 1958, succeeding Georges-Émile Lapalme. Lesage aimed to take advantage of the government's setbacks. Particularly critical of official corruption and Union Nationale policies on federal-provincial relations, he promised to create a "strong and dynamic state" against the "occupying regime". The party could also count on recently recruited star candidate René Lévesque to promote its program.

In addition to the two main parties, the Social Democratic Party (the Quebec branch of the Co-operative Commonwealth Federation) participated in the election, led by trade unionist Michel Chartrand. Lacking funds, however, it failed to present a candidate.

On March 18, 1960, two new constituencies were created, raising the number of seats in the legislature to 95. One of these was named Duplessis in honour of the late premier. The writ of election dropped on April 27, setting the electoral campaign in motion.

Campaign
Despite the Liberal Party's ambitious program and the disarray of the UN, it was difficult to predict the outcome of the vote at the outset of the campaign. The incumbent party still enjoyed significant support and many constituencies faced close races. No leaders' debate was held as the parties could not agree on a format. 

The campaign revolved around the two leaders, Barrette and Lesage. Barrette stressed continuity with his predecessors, frequently appearing in publicity campaigns featuring Duplessis and Sauvé. He travelled across the province, relying more on voters' faith in him personally than on an electoral platform, which the UN did not publish. At the beginning of the campaign, he even wrote in the party's organ Montréal-Matin: "Our program was formulated in 1931 and current legislation bears witness to its implementation."

Lesage meanwhile led an "American-style" campaign, focusing on voter outreach to counter the public's perception of him as haughty. He took inspiration from Harry Truman, sometimes spending up to three days in the same region listening to local demands.

Results

See also
 List of Quebec premiers
 Politics of Quebec
 Timeline of Quebec history
 List of Quebec political parties
 26th Legislative Assembly of Quebec

Further reading

References

External links
 CBC TV video clip

Quebec general election
Elections in Quebec
General election
Quebec general election